UFC 23: Ultimate Japan 2 was a mixed martial arts event held by the Ultimate Fighting Championship on November 19, 1999 at Tokyo Bay NK Hall in Tokyo, Japan.

History
UFC 23 was the second UFC event to take place in Tokyo, Japan, where the newly formed PRIDE Fighting Championships were enjoying massive success. UFC 23 was headlined by a Heavyweight Championship Title bout between Kevin Randleman and Pete Williams, held to determine the champion after Bas Rutten's retirement.

The event also featured a four-man "Japanese" tournament, held to crown the first ever UFC Japan Champion. The tournament was the first in the UFC since UFC 17, and the last one-night tournament held by the UFC (subsequent multiple-night tournaments have since taken place in 2003 at UFC 39 and UFC 41, and in 2012 at UFC on FX 2, UFC on FX 3, and UFC 152). SEG originally intended UFC Japan to be a separate company, run by local promoters, but due to mounting financial problems, a lack of cooperation from Japanese promoters, and the rise of the popular PRIDE and K-1 organizations, the idea was scrapped following UFC 25: Ultimate Japan 3.

UFC 23 was the first UFC event to not see a home video release, as SEG was nearing bankruptcy and struggling to keep the UFC alive through extremely limited pay per view in the US, as well as minor coverage in Brazil and Japan.  UFC 23 has now been released as part of a DVD collection (UFC 21–30). It was also the first to feature James Werme who handled backstage interviews.

Bas Rutten announced at UFC 23 that he dropped his heavyweight championship title so he could drop down to middleweight to bring Frank Shamrock out of retirement to fight for the middleweight championship.

Results

UFC Japan Tournament

See also
 Ultimate Fighting Championship
 List of UFC champions
 List of UFC events
 1999 in UFC

External links
Official UFC website

Ultimate Fighting Championship events
1999 in mixed martial arts
Mixed martial arts in Japan
Sports competitions in Tokyo
1999 in Japanese sport